The 1996–97 C.D. Guadalajara season was the 90th season in the football club's history. Guadalajara competed in Primera División and Copa México, winning the Verano 1997 tournament.

Coaching staff

Players

Squad information

Players and squad numbers last updated on 30 January 2019.Note: Flags indicate national team as has been defined under FIFA eligibility rules. Players may hold more than one non-FIFA nationality.

Competitions

Overview

Torneo Invierno

League table

Results summary

Matches

Liguilla

Quarter-finals

Torneo Verano

League table

Statistics

Goals

Hat-tricks

Clean sheets

References

C.D. Guadalajara seasons
1996–97 Mexican Primera División season
1996–97 in Mexican football